Choristoneura heliaspis is a species of moth of the family Tortricidae. It is found in Ethiopia, Nigeria, South Africa and Mozambique.

References

Moths described in 1909
Choristoneura